Volt (symbol V) is the SI derived unit for electromotive force and potential difference, named after Alessandro Volta.

Volt or Volts may also refer to:

Electrical measurement 
 electron volt (eV), a unit of energy in physics
 volt-ampere (VA), a unit used to measure the apparent power in an electrical circuit
 volt-ampere reactive (var), a unit used to measure reactive power in an AC system
 Volt meter, instrument for measuring electrical potential
 Volt-ohm meter (VOM), instrument that combines several electrical measurement functions
 volt-second (V⋅s), more commonly the weber (Wb), a unit of magnetic flux
 Volts Center Tapped (VCT), a unit of voltage output of a center tapped transformer

Entertainment and media
 Ugo Volt, a computer game
 Volt, a poetry magazine published by Sonoma State University
 Volt (Dungeons & Dragons), a creature in the Dungeons & Dragons series
 Volt (Transformers), a fictional character in the Transformers series
 Volt (TV series), a Canadian television series in French
 Volt Records, classic soul record label
 Volts (album), an album by AC/DC
 Volt, an EP by Trip Shakespeare

People 
 Alessandro Volta (1745–1827), the Italian physicist after whom the term volt is named
 John Volts (1825–1904?), a British critic, philosopher and writer.

Other uses
 Chevrolet Volt, an American plug-in hybrid automobile
 Volt Europa, a pan-European political party

Volt Albania, its branch in Albania
Volt Austria, its branch in Austria
Volt Belgium, its branch in Belgium
Volt Bulgaria, its branch in Bulgaria
Volt Cyprus, its branch in Cyprus
Volt Czech Republic, its branch in Czech Republic
Volt Denmark, its branch in Denmark
Volt France, its branch in France
Volt Germany, its branch in Germany
Volt Greece, its branch in Greece
Volt Ireland, its branch in Ireland
Volt Italia, its branch in Italy
Volt Luxembourg, its branch in Luxembourg
Volt Malta, its branch in Malta
Volt Netherlands, its branch in the Netherlands
Volt Portugal, its branch in Portugal
Volt Romania, its branch in Romania
Volt Spain, its branch in Spain
Volt Sweden, its branch in Sweden
Volt Switzerland, its branch in Switzerland
Volt Ukraine, its branch in Ukraine
Volt UK, its branch in United Kingdom
 Volt Technical Resources, a third-party recruiting company based in New York City
 VoltDB, an in-memory database
 Volt, a shade of the color Lime
 Volt Bank, a neobank in Australia (defunct)

See also 
 Voltage (disambiguation)
 Megavolt (disambiguation)
 Ampere (disambiguation)